The Mongolia national korfball team is managed by the Mongolian Korfball Federation (MKF), representing Mongolia in korfball international competitions. They became an International Korfball Federation in 2010.

References

National korfball teams
Korfball in Mongolia